State schools are a type of institution for people with intellectual and developmental disabilities in the United States. These institutions are run by individual states. These state schools were and are famous for abuse and neglect. In many states, the residents were involuntary sterilized during the eugenics era. Many states have closed state schools as part of the deinstitutionalisation movement.

History

Hopes of Reformers 
Many progressive reformers in the mid-1800s noticed the horrible conditions experienced by people with disabilities and wanted to improve them. Many people with disabilities were put in prison or poorhouses.

Dorothea Dix described:"More than nine-thousand idiots, epileptics, and insane in these United States, destitute of appropriate care and protection. Bound with galling chains, bowed beneath fetters and heavy iron balls, attached to drag-chains, lacerated with ropes, scourged with rods, and terrified beneath storms of profane execrations and cruel blows; now subject to jibes, and scorn, and torturing tricks, now abandoned to the most loathsome necessities or subject to the vilest and most outrageous violations.Samuel Gridley-Howe and other reformers wanted to establish training schools where people with intellectual disabilities could learn and be prepared for society.

The history of state schools and psychiatric hospitals are linked throughout history. State schools started being built in the United States in the 1850s. People often used the term "feeble-minded" which could apply to both intellectual and developmental disabilities and mental illness, or in some cases, perceived sexual promiscuity.

Establishment 
In 1848 Howe founded the Massachusetts School for Idiotic and Feeble-Minded Youth, a private boarding school for people with intellectual disabilities. In that same year, Hervey Wilbur founded a private school in his home in New York. Both schools taught according to the teachings Edouard Seguin. These early training schools sought to educate students and provide schooling, assistance with self-care tasks and physical training.

The first state-funded school was the New York Asylum for Idiots. It was established in Albany in 1851. This state school aimed to educate children with intellectual disabilities and was reportedly successful in doing so. The school's Board of Trustees declared, in 1853, that the experiment had "entirely and fully succeeded." That success led the New York state legislature to found another building, which opened in Syracuse in 1855. The superintendent of this school for the next 32 years was Hervey Wilbur. In 1852, a school for "feeble-minded" youth opened in Germantown, Pennsylvania, and another in Columbus, Ohio in 1857.

While the number of schools continued to increase, the amount of training did not. These "schools" soon became custodial institutions, places to house people to keep them out of society. Rather than preparing students to join the community, these schools only trained people to do work in an institution setting. The residents that were able were put to work in the institution. Institutions began to argue for funding, saying that they are housing people that would otherwise be in almshouses or poorhouses. These larger custodial institutions were established in many states in the following decades.

Schools, colonies and farms 
Training schools sought to train people with intellectual and developmental disabilities, even if that aim was almost never followed through. Other models of institutions also arose, but all of them were often called state schools.

Superintendents of institutions believed that people with different disabilities should be separated. Often, institutions would establish separate buildings, such as an "epileptic colony" and places for "high-grades," which was the term used to refer to people with disabilities who were forced to work in institutions. One specific way people were forced to work were farm colonies. People would purchase cheap rural farm land and force the residents to work on the farm growing food and harvesting dairy products. The food produced was either used for the institutions or sold. Many institutions sought to develop self-sufficiency. This was another way to keep people with disabilities separated from society.

Eugenics 
These large custodial institutions continued to be built into the 20th century. At the same time, eugenics began to gain proponents throughout the United States, as well as Europe. Eugenics centered around the aim to increase the "genetic quality" of the human race. Eugenicists decided that some traits were "undesirable." One of the primary undesirable traits was "feeble-mindedness." Scientists and doctors became much less concern with teaching or training people with disabilities and focused more on separating them from society, stopping them from reproducing, and in some cases, advocating for their murder.

Many eugenicists thought that white Western Europeans were superior to other races and peoples. They developed extremely flawed measures to "prove" this superiority. The Stanford-Binet IQ test was developed to identify people who were feeble-minded. In 1913 the United States Public Health Service administered the newly invented Binet IQ test to immigrants arriving at Ellis Island. Professional researchers recorded that "79% of the Italians, 80% of the Hungarians, 83% of the Jews, and 87% of the Russians are feeble-minded." These findings, as well as others, were used to justify racism and anti-immigrant xenophobia in the United States and Europe.

In addition, new compulsory public school laws required children to attend school. Teachers had more chances to notice people who struggled and recommend them for an institutions. Eugenics proponents also taught classes to teachers on identifying the "feeble-minded."

Throughout this era, the most popular belief was that intellectual and developmental disabilities, as well as mental illness, were entirely genetic and resulted in poverty, drunkenness, sexual promiscuity, crime, violence, and other social ills. People with disabilites were considered "menaces." Dr. Henry Goddard, a psychologist at Vineland Training School in New Jersey, wrote a book claiming that they investigated the family history of a women at the institution and demonstrated that "feeble-mindedness" was genetic and caused all of social ills. Goddard said,"There are Kallikak families all about us. They are multiplying at twice the rate of the general population, and not until we recognize this fact, and work on this basis, will we begin to solve [our] social problems."Painting so many people as a threat led to increasing numbers of people sent to institutions. Institutions became even more overcrowded. Superintendents, concerned about overcrowding and of the "threat" of people with disabilities having children's, started to sterilize the inmates. Many of those sterilized against their will were living in state schools or state hospitals. Over thirty states had compulsory sterilization laws and over 60,000 people with disabilities were sterilized.

Buck v. Bell, the infamous Supreme Court case that legalized involuntarily sterilization, was about Carrie Buck, a woman diagnosed as "feeble-minded" after she was raped by her foster brother and put into an institution. A family tree (that was later shown to be falsified) said that she was the third generation diagnosed with feeble-mindedness. US Supreme Court Justice Oliver Wendell Holmes, Jr. famously declared "three generations of imbeciles are enough!"

American eugenicists would go onto serve as a model for Nazi Germany to replicate as they sought to institutionalize, sterilize, and murder the "undesirables" in their own country.

Lists of state schools

Alabama 
Bryce State Hospital *Served inmates with I/DD until Partlow opened

Searcy Hospital *Served inmates with I/DD until Partlow opened

Partlow State School and Hospital, Tuscaloosa (1919–2011)

Lurleen Wallace Developmental Center, Decatur (1971–2003)

J.S. Tarwater Developmental Center, Wetumpka (1976–2004)

Albert P. Brewer Developmental Center, Mobile (1973–2001) In 2001, residents were moved to different buildings in Daphne.

 Albert Brewer-Bayside Developmental Center, Daphne (−2004)

Glenn Ireland Developmental Center, Birmingham (1986–1996)

Alaska 
Morningside Hospital, Portland, Oregon (1904-1960s) In the 1960s, residents were moved to Harborview Center.

Baby Louise Haven, Salem, Oregon (−1960s) In the 1960s, residents were moved to Harborview Center.

Harborview Developmental Center, Valdez (1960–1997)

Arizona 
Arizona State Hospital, Phoenix (1887-1985) After 1985, residents were placed in the community.

Arizona Training Program, Coolidge (1952–Present)

Arizona Training Program, Tucson (1973–1997)

Arizona Training Program, Phoenix (1973–1988)

Arkansas 
Arkansas State Hospital (1888–1959) In 1959, people with I/DD started to be moved to other facilities

Arkansas Children's Colony/Conway Human Development Center (1959–present)

Arkadelphia Human Development Center (1968–present)

Booneville Human Development Center (1973–present)

Jonesboro Human Development Center (1974–present)

Southeast Arkansas Human Development Center (1978–present)

Alexander Human Development Center (-2011)

California 
Sonoma State Home (1883–2018)

Lanterman State Hospital and Developmental Center (1921–2015)

Agnews State Mental Hospital (1885–2011)

Camarillo State Mental Hospital (1936–1997)

Fairview Developmental Center, Costa Mesa (1959-)

Porterville Developmental Center (1953-)

Canyon Springs Developmental Center (2000–Present)

Sierra Vista, Yuba City (2000-2010)

Colorado 
Colorado State Home and Training School/Ridge Home (1909–1992)

Colorado State Hospital/Pueblo Regional Center (-Present)

State Home for Mental Defectives/Grand Junction Regional Center (1921–present)

Wheat Ridge Regional Center (1912–present)

Connecticut 
Southbury Training School (1930s-Present)

Mansfield State Training School and Hospital (1860-1993)

Delaware 
Stockley Center Hospital for the Mentally Retarded, Stockley (1921-Present)

District of Columbia 
Forest Haven, Laurel, Maryland (1922–1991)

Florida 
Florida Farm Colony for Epileptic and Feeble-Minded/Sunland Training Center Gainesville/Tacachale (1921–present)

Sunland Training Center Fort Meyer/Gulf Coast Center (1960-2010)

Sunland Training Center Orlando (early 1960s-1985)

Sunland Training Center Marianna (1960s-Present)

Sunland Training Center Miami/Landmark Learning Center (1966-2005)

Sunland Training Center Tallahassee  (-1983)

Sunland Training Center Dorr Field (1968-1969)

Georgia 
Gracewood State School and Hospital (1921-Present)

Central State Hospital, Milledgeville (1842-Present)

Hawaii 
Waimano Training School and Hospital (1919–1999)

Idaho 
Idaho State School and Hospital

Illinois 
Lincoln State School and Colony (1877-2002)

Dixon State School (1918-1983)

Jacksonville Developmental Center (1974*-2012) *Before 1974, the facility only included people with mental illness.

Howe State School

Choate Developmental & Mental Heath Center

Ludeman Developmental Center

Fox Developmental Center

Mabley Developmental Center, Dixon (1987-Present)

Kiley Developmental Center

Murray Developmental Center

Shapiro Developmental Center

Indiana 
Fort Wayne State School for Feeble Minded Youth (1890–2007)

Muscatatuck Colony (1920–2005)

Iowa 
Institution for Feebleminded Children at Glenwood (1876-Present)

The Hospital for Epileptics and Feebleminded at Woodward (1917)

Kansas 
Winfield State Hospital, Winfield (1888–1988)

Kentucky 
Frankfurt State Hospital & School (1860–1972)

Louisiana 
State Colony and Training School, Pineville

Maine 
Pineland Center, New Gloucester (1909–1996)

Maryland 
Crownsville Hospital Center

Rosewood Center (1888–2009)

Massachusetts 
Walter E. Fernald State School (1848–2014)

Templeton Farm Colony (1899–2015)

Wrentham State School (1910–)

Belchertown State School, Belchertown (1922–1992)

Michigan 
Plymouth Center for Human Development

Wayne County Training School, Northville Township (1926–1974)

Caro Center/Michigan Farm Colony for Epileptics, Wahjamega/Caro (1914)

Lapeer State Home and Training School (1895–1991)

Minnesota 
Faribault School for the Feeble-Minded and Colony of Epileptics, Faribault (1879–1998)

Mississippi 
Ellisville State School (1921–)

Missouri 
Fulton State Hospital (1847–present)

Missouri State Colony for Feebleminded and Epileptic/Missouri State School (1899–), split into the following three state schools in 1959

 Marshall State School and Hospital
 Carrollton State School and Hospital
 Higginsville State School and Hospital

St. Louis Training School/St Louis State School and Hospital (1922)

Montana 
Montana State Training School, Boulder (1896–)

Nebraska 
Beatrice State Home (1885–)

Nevada 
Nevada State Hospital/Nevada State School and Hospital/Nevada Habilitation Center (1887–2012)

New Hampshire 
Laconia State School (1901–1991)

New Jersey 
Vineland Training School (1887–)

Johnstone Training and Research Center

New Mexico 
Fort Stanton State Hospital for the Developmentally Handicapped (1960s–1995)

Los Lunas Hospital and Training School (1929–1997)

Villa Solano (1973–1975)

New York 
Syracuse State School, Syracuse (1855–1998)

New York Custodial Asylum for Feeble-Minded Women, Newark, New York (1878)

Rome State Custodial Asylum for Un-Teachable Idiots, Rome (1894)

Craig Colony for Epileptics, Sonyea (1894–1968)

Letchworth Village (1912)

Willowbrook State School, Staten Island (1947–1987)

North Carolina 
Caswell Training School

O'Berry School (1957–)

North Carolina Farm Colony

North Dakota 
Grafton State School

Ohio 
Ohio Asylum for the Education of Idiotic and Imbecile Youth, Columbus (1857)

Broadview Developmental Center

Warrensville Developmental Center

Northwest Ohio Developmental Center

Oklahoma 
Enid State School (1909–2014)

Pauls Valley State School (1907–2015)

Hissom Memorial Center (1961)

Taft State Hospital

Greer Center (1989–)

Oregon 
Fairview Training Center

Pennsylvania 
Pennhurst State School and Hospital, Spring City (1903–1987)

Elwyn Training School

Rhode Island 
Ladd School/Ladd Center (1908–1986)

South Carolina 
State Training School for the Feeble-minded/Whitten Center (1918–present)

South Dakota 
Redfield State School and Home for the Feeble Minded/South Dakota Developmental Center (1899–present)

Tennessee 
Tennessee Home and Training School for Feeble-Minded Persons/Clover Bottom Development Center, Donelson (1923–2015)

Greene Valley Developmental Center (1962–2017)

Arlington Developmental Center (1968–2010)

Nat T. Winston Developmental Center (−1998)

Texas 
Texas state supported living centers

Austin State School/Austin State Supported Living Center (1915–present)

Austin State School Farm Colony/Travis State School (1933–1996)

Fort Worth State School

Abilene State Supported Living Center (Abilene SSLC)

Brenham SSLC

Corpus Chrsti SSLC

Denton SSLC

El Paso SSLC

Lubbock SSLC

Lufkin SSLC

Mexia SSLC

Richmond SSLC

Rio Grande SSLC

San Angelo SSLC

San Antonio SSLC

Utah 
Utah State Training School (1929–present)

Vermont 
Brandon State School (1915–1993)

Virginia 
State Colony for Epileptics and Feebleminded/Central Virginia Training Center (1910–2020)

Central State Hospital (1870–present)

Washington 
Eastern State Custodial School/Lakeland Village, Medical Lake (1905–present)

Western State Custodial School/Ranier State School (1939–present)

Wisconsin 
Wisconsin Home for the Feeble-Minded/Northern Wisconsin Center for the Developmentally Disabled (1897–present)

Wyoming 
Wyoming State Training School/Wyoming Life Resource Center, Lander (1912)

References

Developmental disabilities
Eugenics in the United States
Disability in the United States